Latisha Chan and Martina Hingis were the defending champions, but Chan chose to compete in Birmingham and Hingis retired from professional tennis at the end of 2017.

Andreja Klepač and María José Martínez Sánchez won the title, defeating Lucie Šafářová and Barbora Štefková in the final, 6–1, 3–6, [10–3].

Seeds

Draw

Draw

References
 Main Draw

Mallorca Openandnbsp;- Doubles
Doubles